Maxime Fortunus (born July 28, 1983 in La Prairie, Quebec) is a retired Canadian professional ice hockey defenceman who most recently played for the Fischtown Pinguins of the Deutsche Eishockey Liga (DEL). Fortunus is of Haitian descent, his parents being born in Haiti, then immigrating to Canada in the 1970s.

Playing career
Prior to playing in the QMJHL, Fortunus played Midget AAA hockey for the Charles Lemoyne Riverains and was a 2nd round choice of the Baie-Comeau Drakkar in the 1999 QMJHL Midget Draft.

Fortunus played junior ice hockey for the Baie-Comeau Drakkar of the Quebec Major Junior Hockey League from 1999 to 2003 before turning professional with the Louisiana IceGators of the ECHL.  Fortunus has played over 700 games in the American Hockey League for the Houston Aeros, the Manitoba Moose, and the Texas Stars.

Fortunus was signed as a free agent by the Dallas Stars of the NHL on July 3, 2008. In the 2009–10 season, he has played for both Dallas and the Stars' top affiliate team in the AHL, the Texas Stars, where he is a regular.

Fortunus signed a one-year two-way deal with the Dallas Stars on July 13, 2012.

After six seasons within the Stars organization, serving as a mainstay veteran presence to their AHL affiliates, Fortunus signed as a free agent to a two-year AHL contract with the Iowa Wild, affiliate to the Minnesota Wild on July 1, 2015.

At the conclusion of his contract with the Iowa, he went un-signed over the summer as a free agent. With the 2017–18 season underway, he belatedly signed a professional tryout contract with the Springfield Thunderbirds on November 14, 2017. As a staple on the blueline for the Thunderbirds, Fortunus appeared in 54 games for 2 goals and 12 points.

Having completed his 15th consecutive year in the AHL, Fortunus left as a free agent and signed his first contract abroad at the age of 34 on a one-year deal with German outfit, Fischtown Pinguins of the DEL, on May 7, 2018.

In May 2021, Fortunus announced his retirement from professional hockey and rejoined the Dallas Stars organization as an assistant coach of the Texas Stars in the American Hockey League.

Career statistics

Awards and honours

References

External links

1983 births
Living people
Baie-Comeau Drakkar players
Black Canadian ice hockey players
Canadian ice hockey defencemen
Canadian sportspeople of Haitian descent
Dallas Stars players
Fischtown Pinguins players
Haitian Quebecers
Houston Aeros (1994–2013) players
Ice hockey people from Quebec
Iowa Wild players
Louisiana IceGators (ECHL) players
Manitoba Moose players
People from La Prairie, Quebec
Springfield Thunderbirds players
Texas Stars players
Undrafted National Hockey League players